YamaArashi (stylized as YAMAARASHI (山嵐)) is a six-member Japanese rock group based in Kanagawa Prefecture. They use a blend of metal, reggae, and rap, to perform what is called nu metal. YamaArashi was formed in 1996. In April 2002, YamaArashi also runs a label called Chokkyu Recordings. YamaArashi has performed with popular acts such as HeavensDust, Orange Range and Moomin. In 2008, YamaArashi played in the ETPFEST, the South Korean music festival alongside bands such as Dragon Ash and Death Cab for Cutie.

Members 
 Yoshiaki Ishii - Drums
 Takeshi - Bass and Vocal
 Kaji - Guitar
 Naoya Kojima - Vocal
 Satoshi Ohtake  - Vocal
 Oga - Guitar. Joined YamaArashi in 2000. Former Member of Mach25.

Discography

Singles 
[1997.06.21] A New Species
[1998.06.21] Yogen (予言)
[1999.03.05] The Ties of Lycaon
[2000.08.23] Black Hole/Hologram (ブラックホール／ホログラム)
[2000.12.06] Wide Vision
[2001.09.27] Yamaarashi-ism (ヤマアラシイズム)
[2002.06.19] Itadaki (山嶺(いただき))
[2003.10.22] La La Singin' Music feat. Leyona
[2003.12.03] Arashi 2003 feat Rappagariya  (嵐2003 feat.ラッパ我リヤ)
[2006.02.22] Go Your Way, The ending theme for the anime The Frogman Show, produced by Seiji Kameda

Albums 
1997: YamaArashi (山嵐)
1999: Mitaiken Zone (未体験ゾーン)
2001: Six Men (シックスメン)
2002: Mountain Rock (マウンテンロック)
2003: Colors Water Music, Collaboration Album
2005: Aiterasu (アイテラス)
2006: Shonan Mirai Ezu (湘南未来絵図)
2008: Noroshi (狼煙 -Noroshi-)

Split albums
[2005.02.23] Kakumei (革命) (YamaArashi vs. Rize)

Live albums
[2003.03.26] Live

Compilations
[2001.11.28] 1997-2001 Single Collection
[2002.05.22] Super Best

DVDs 
[2000.06.28] Mitaiken Zone Tour '99 (未体験ゾーンTOUR'99)
[2001.07.25] Six Men Tour '01 (シックスメンツアー'01)
[2002.03.27] Film Collection
[2004.06.23] 6 Colors

References

External links 
Official Site (Japanese)
Official Blog (Japanese)
Official Myspace Site (Japanese)

Japanese rock music groups
Musical groups established in 1996
Musical groups from Kanagawa Prefecture
Dreamusic artists